Armaan: Story of a Storyteller  (Short Armaan) is a 2017 Indian Gujarati drama film directed by Rehan Chaudhary. Starring Poojan Trivedi, Alisha Prajapati, Netri Trivedi, Prashant Barot and Twisha Bhatt.

Cast
 Poojan Trivedi  as Armaan
 Alisha Prajapati as Alie
 Netri Trivedi as Biyara
 Prashant Barot as Rajubhai
 D.Kay as Dev Kakkad
 Twisha bhatt as Priya
 Raahul vyas as Joy

Filming
The film is set and shot in Ahmedabad & Vadodara.

Soundtrack

Samir Mana gave the Music of the film and the lyrics were penned by D - Kay. The Music of the film was released by Krup Music.

Release
The film was released on 10 February 2017 in India.

References

External links
 
 Armaan: Story of a Storyteller at Dhudiya Entertainment

2017 films
Films set in Ahmedabad
Films shot in Ahmedabad
Indian drama films
2010s Gujarati-language films
2017 drama films